Prathipadu is a village in Guntur district of the Indian state of Andhra Pradesh. It is located in Prathipadu mandal of Guntur revenue division.  The village forms a part of Andhra Pradesh Capital Region and is under the jurisdiction of APCRDA.

Education 

As per the school information report for the academic year 2018–19, the village has a total of 4 Zilla/Mandal Parishad schools.

References 

Villages in Guntur district
Mandal headquarters in Guntur district